The 1971 Jordanian  League (known as The Jordanian  League, was the 21st season of Jordan  League since its inception in 1944, In the 1971 it was called (first division league) . Al-Faisaly won its  12th title.

Teams

Map

League table 

 Al-Shabab Withdrew From the league , All results of the team have been crossed out.

Overview
Al-Faysali won the championship.

References
RSSSF

External links
 Jordan Football Association website

Jordanian Pro League seasons
Jordan
Jordan
football